Alessandro Lupi (born 28 July 1970) is an Italian former professional footballer manager and former player who played as a midfielder. He most recently managed Chiasso in the Swiss Challenge League.

Coaching career
Luppi joined AC Milan in 2011 and worked as head of academy for six years and in 2017 he was appointed U17 team head coach. when Gennaro Gattuso was appointed head coach of Milan he promoted to the U19 coach. In 2019 he joined Chiasso as head coach.

References

1970 births
Living people
Italian footballers
Association football midfielders
Serie B players
Serie C players
Swiss Challenge League players
A.S.D. SolbiaSommese Calcio players
FC Lugano players
FC Chiasso players
Aurora Pro Patria 1919 players
Calcio Lecco 1912 players
Italian football managers
FC Chiasso managers
A.C. Milan non-playing staff
Italian expatriate footballers
Italian expatriate football managers
Italian expatriate sportspeople in Switzerland
Expatriate football managers in Switzerland